Anne-Karine Strøm (born 15 October 1951) is a Norwegian singer, best known for having taken part in the Norwegian Eurovision Song Contest selection, Melodi Grand Prix, in six consecutive years between 1971 and 1976, winning on three occasions (twice as a soloist and once as a member of an ensemble) and representing Norway in the Eurovision Song Contests of 1973, 1974 and 1976.

Melodi Grand Prix 

Strøm's Melodi Grand Prix appearances were as follows:
1971: "Hør litt på meg" – 10th
1972: "Håp" – 4th
1973: "Å for et spill" (as member of the Bendik Singers) – 1st
1974: "Hvor er du" – 1st
1975: "1+1=2" – 4th
1976: "Mata Hari" – 1st

Eurovision Song Contest 

The Bendik Singers' 1973 winning song was given English-language lyrics and retitled "It's Just A Game" for the 18th Eurovision Song Contest, which took place on 7 April in Luxembourg City, where it finished in seventh place of 17 entries.

Strøm travelled to Brighton, England for the 1974 contest, held on 6 April.  Again, the song had been translated into English as "The First Day of Love", and backing vocals were provided by the other Bendik Singers.  This was the notable contest which was won by ABBA and also featured several already internationally established names (Olivia Newton-John, Gigliola Cinquetti, Mouth & MacNeal).  In this competitive field, "The First Day of Love" struggled to attract votes and ended as one of four songs sharing last place with just three votes each.

Strøm's final Eurovision appearance, at the 1976 contest in The Hague on 3 April, ended in complete failure, as "Mata Hari" placed last of the 18 participating songs.  Prior to the contest "Mata Hari", a very modern and contemporary disco-style song, had been expected to do well, but it was suggested afterwards that Strøm's rather odd outfit and performance on the night may have cost votes. With two last-place finishes from three entries, Strøm is usually cited as the least successful artist to have appeared in more than one Eurovision Song Contest as the only artist to date finish in last place twice.

Post-Eurovision 
In the late 1970s Strøm began performing in musical cabarets with Øystein Sunde and her then husband Ole Paus.  She released three albums between 1978 and 1986, which reflected a move towards a more serious style of music.

Albums discography 
1971: Drømmebilde
1975: Anne Karin
1978: Album
1982: Casablancas Døtre
1986: Landet utenfor

References

External links 
 Discography at 45cat

1951 births
Living people
Eurovision Song Contest entrants of 1973
Eurovision Song Contest entrants of 1974
Eurovision Song Contest entrants of 1976
Melodi Grand Prix contestants
Melodi Grand Prix winners
Eurovision Song Contest entrants for Norway
Norwegian women singers
Musicians from Oslo
English-language singers from Norway